Megalobrama mantschuricus is a species of ray-finned fish in the genus Megalobrama.

Footnotes 
 

Megalobrama
Fish described in 1855